Tribe is a creative nonfiction book written by Sebastian Junger and published by Simon & Schuster in 2016.

In Tribe (2016) Junger studies war veterans from an anthropological perspective and asks "How do you make veterans feel that they are returning to a cohesive society that was worth fighting for in the first place?" Junger's premise is that "Soldiers ignore differences of race, religion and politics within their platoon..." and upon return to America, find a fractious society splintered into various competing factions, often hostile to one another.

Reception
Jennifer Senior, writing in The New York Times, called Tribe one of the "most intriguing political books" of the election year, "all without mentioning a single candidate, or even the president, by name."

References

Simon & Schuster books
2016 non-fiction books
Twelve (publisher) books